Igor Lucić (born 18 February 1991 in Belgrade) is a Serbian rower.

He won a gold medal at the 2011 World Rowing U23 Championships in Men's Coxed fours and posted U23 world record. He defended Serbia's U23 title at the 2012 World Rowing U23 Championships in Trakai, Lithuania.

He represented Azerbaijan internationally from 2013 to 2015.

References

1991 births
Living people
Azerbaijani male rowers
Serbian male rowers
Sportspeople from Belgrade